Saint Petersburg–Warsaw Railway (() (transliteration: Sankt-Peterburgo–Varshavskaya zheleznaya doroga)) is a  long railway, built in the 19th century by the Russian Empire to connect Russia with Central Europe. At the time the entire railway was within the Russian Empire: Warsaw was under a Russian partition of Poland. Due to territorial changes, the line now lies within five countries and crosses the eastern border of the European Union three times. Therefore, no passenger trains follow the entire route. Passenger trains between Saint Petersburg and Warsaw today travel through Brest instead and a new line called Rail Baltica is under development to improve the direct connection between Poland and Lithuania.

History

Construction
In February 1851 the Tsarist Government of Russia made a decision to build the St. Petersburg–Warsaw railway line with a length of approximately 1,250 kilometers. It was built to Russian gauge. Construction was completed in 1862.

The first section of the railway was completed in 1853 between Saint Petersburg and Gatchina, with daily scheduled train service started on 31 October 1853. On 19 July 1858 the first train arrived in Pskov.

In May 1858, construction started near Vilnius on the first section of 19 kilometers. On 1 May 1859 the ground works started along the entire route Daugavpils–Vilnius–Lentvaris–Kaunas–Kybartai. The end of summer of 1860 marked the end of the construction of the Ostrov-Daugavpils–Vilnius railway. The first train from Daugavpils  arrived in Vilnius on 16 September 1860. In 1861, this branch was completed to the Prussian border, and between Verzhbolovo Station in Kybartai and Eydtkuhnen in Prussia (now Chernyshevskoye in Russian Kaliningrad Oblast) the first junction between Russian gauge and standard gauge railway systems was built, with rails in both gauges between the border stations.

The construction of the section from Lentvaris to Warsaw was completed on 15 December 1862.

The first locomotives for the St. Petersburg–Warsaw railway were bought in England, France, and Belgium. They were “G” class 0-6-0s with two cylinders. They were produced in Manchester in 1857, in Paris in 1860, and in Belgium in 1862. Their weight was 30–32 tons.

The portion between Vilnius and Warsaw was rebuilt in the standard gauge in the 1920s when that area belonged to Poland. The railway was partly destroyed during both world wars.

Present
A 224km section of the line between Zielonka, some 13km north-east of Warsaw and Kuźnica Białostocka on the Polish-Belarusian border, some 54km north-east Białystok is today designated by the Polish National Railways PKP Polskie Linie Kolejowe as PKP rail line 6. It is one of countries major trunk lines. The line is electrified along its entire length, and has two tracks up to Białystok. 

In Zielonka a 9km long line built in 1933, today designated PKP rail line 449 branches of from the former Warsaw-Sankt Petersburg railway south to the former Warsaw–Terespol railway and through it to the Warsaw Cross-City Line and the other trunk lines of the Warsaw Railway Junction. The original route continues south-west as PKP rail line 21 terminating at the Warszawa Wileńska station in Warsaw Praga district, without reaching the city center. This segment is used only for local passenger traffic in the Warsaw metropolitan area, however due to large passenger volumes it is designated as a primary line. Line 21 also extends north-east from Zielonka to Wołomin along line 6, giving a total of four tracks on this segment.

From Białystok to Kuźnica Białostocka line 6 has only one track, which shortly before the Polish-Belarusian border is joined by a broad gauge track designated PKP rail line 57, with several transshipment facilities along its route. Both lines extend across the border and continue from Bruzhi into Hrodna, with the standard gauge line electrified at 3 kV DC which is commonly used by the Polish railways, rather than 25 kV AC used on the two Belarusian trunk lines. This allows Polish trains to reach Hrodna without the need for time consuming break of gauge operations and replacing traction power, and before 2020 Polish companies offered regular connections there.

From Hrodna however only the broad gauge track continues to Uzbieraž on the Belarusian–Lithuanian border. The track from the border to Marcinkonys in Lithuania has been dismantled at some point at the beginning of the 21st century, from Marcinkonys to Vilnius and further north-east the line remains in use for local regional traffic, although there have been some sporadic connections between Vilnius and Daugavpils.

Trains traveling between Warsaw and Vilnius today have to take a long detour through Ełk and Kaunas. With Belarus under the Łukašenka regime being a rogue state it appears extremely unlikely a direct connection through Hrodna might be restored in the foreseeable future. Instead a project called Rail Baltica is underway to upgrade existing infrastructure and build new standard gauge lines in order to improve the rail connection from Poland to Lithuania, Latvia, further to Estonia and eventually to Finland, running entirely within EU territory.

See also

References

Sources
 
 

Railway lines in Poland
Railway lines in Belarus
Railway lines in Lithuania
Railway lines in Latvia
Railway lines in Russia
Establishments in Congress Poland
19th-century establishments in Poland
19th-century establishments in the Russian Empire
International railway lines
1520 mm gauge railways in Russia
5 ft gauge railways in Latvia
1520 mm gauge railways in Lithuania
1520 mm gauge railways in Poland
1520 mm gauge railways in Belarus
1862 establishments in the Russian Empire
1850s establishments in the Russian Empire